Europe Lake, is a lake near Gills Rock in Door County, Wisconsin. It is the northeasternmost lake in Wisconsin. The lake is mainly a shallow lowland marsh, similar to nearby Kangaroo Lake. It is suspected that the lake was once part of Lake Michigan until a drop in Lake Michigan's water levels closed off the bay and made it a lake.

Fish species
Bluegill
Northern pike
Smallmouth bass
Walleye
Perch

Location

Climate

See also
 List of lakes of Wisconsin § Door County

References

Fish and Lake information
A 6000 year water level history of Europe Lake, Wisconsin, USA (Archived June 5, 2022)

Lakes of Door County, Wisconsin